The Catholic Church in Dominica is part of the worldwide Catholic Church, under the spiritual leadership of the Pope in Rome.
61.4% of Dominica's population of 73,449 are Catholic. The entire country is under the jurisdiction of a single diocese, the Diocese of Roseau.

References